The 2008–09 Alabama Crimson Tide men's basketball team (variously "Alabama", "UA", "Bama" or "The Tide") represented the University of Alabama in the 2008–09 college basketball season. The head coach was Mark Gottfried, who was in his eleventh year until his resignation January 26th 2009. Philip Pearson would be the interim for the remainder of the season. The team played its home games at Coleman Coliseum in Tuscaloosa, Alabama and was a member of the Southeastern Conference. This was the 96th season of basketball in the school's history. The Crimson Tide finished the season 18–14, 7–9 in SEC play, lost in the quarterfinals of the 2009 SEC men's basketball tournament and were not invited to a post season tournament.

Schedule and results

|-
!colspan=12 style=|Exhibition

|-
!colspan=12 style=|Non-conference regular season

|-
!colspan=12 style=|SEC regular season

|-
!colspan=12 style=| SEC tournament

See also
2009 NCAA Men's Division I Basketball Tournament
2008–09 NCAA Division I men's basketball season
2008–09 NCAA Division I men's basketball rankings

References

Alabama
Alabama Crimson Tide men's basketball seasons
2009 in sports in Alabama
Alabama Crimson Tide